"Bottle of Wine" is a song written and recorded by Tom Paxton, which was also a hit for the band The Fireballs, whose version reached #9 on the Billboard Hot 100 in 1968 and #5 in Canada. It also reached #3 in South Africa. The song, which included only two of Paxton's four verses, with the chorus repeated, appeared on the band's 1967 album, Bottle of Wine. 

The Fireballs' record was produced by Norman Petty, and was ranked #63 on Billboard magazine's Top Hot 100 songs of 1968.

Other versions
Judy Collins on her 1964 concert album The Judy Collins Concert.
Tom Paxton's original was released on his 1965 album, Ain't That News!
The Kingston Trio covered the song on their 1965 album 'Stay Awhile'
Joe Brown released a single in 1968.
Sweeney's Men recorded it with the Capitol Showband in 1970.
Doc Watson and Merle Watson in 1973, which reached #71 on the U.S. country chart.  The song was featured on the duo's 1973 album, Then and Now.
Bamses Venner recorded a Danish translation on their 1978 album B & V.

References

1967 songs
1967 singles
1968 singles
1973 singles
Songs written by Tom Paxton
The Fireballs songs
Doc Watson songs
Atco Records singles
MCA Records singles
Songs about alcohol
Song recordings produced by Norman Petty